Samuel Walker (4 September 1779 – 30 January 1851) was an English ironmaster from Yorkshire.

He was the oldest son of Samuel Walker, an ironmaster in Masbrough.

He was MP for Aldeburgh from 1818 to 1820.

References

External links 
 

1779 births
1851 deaths
People from the Metropolitan Borough of Rotherham
English businesspeople
Members of the Parliament of the United Kingdom for English constituencies
UK MPs 1818–1820